Kosmos 1701 ( meaning Cosmos 1701) is a Soviet US-K missile early warning satellite which was launched in 1985 as part of the Soviet military's Oko programme. The satellite is designed to identify missile launches using optical telescopes and infrared sensors.

Kosmos 1701 was launched from Site 41/1 at Plesetsk Cosmodrome in the Russian SSR. A Molniya-M carrier rocket with a 2BL upper stage was used to perform the launch, which took place at 08:25 UTC on 9 November 1985. The launch successfully placed the satellite into a molniya orbit. It subsequently received its Kosmos designation, and the international designator 1985-105A. The United States Space Command assigned it the Satellite Catalog Number 16235.

It re-entered the Earth's atmosphere on 11 May 2011.

See also

List of Kosmos satellites (1501–1750)
List of R-7 launches (1985–1989)
1985 in spaceflight
List of Oko satellites

References

Kosmos satellites
1985 in spaceflight
Oko
Spacecraft launched by Molniya-M rockets
Spacecraft which reentered in 2011
Spacecraft launched in 1985